Sarah Jane Smith is a fictional character played by Elisabeth Sladen in the long-running BBC Television science fiction series Doctor Who and two of its spin-offs. Sarah Jane is a dogged investigative journalist who first encounters alien time traveller the Doctor while trying to break a story on a top secret research facility, and subsequently becomes his travelling companion on a series of adventures spanning the breadth of space and time. After travelling with The Doctor in four seasons of the show they suddenly part ways, and after this she continues to investigate strange goings-on back on Earth. Over time, Sarah Jane establishes herself as a committed defender of Earth from alien invasions and other threats, occasionally reuniting with The Doctor in the course of her own adventures, all the while continuing to work as a freelance investigative journalist.

Sarah Jane is one of the Doctor's longest-serving companions, co-starring in 18 stories (80 episodes) with the third and fourth incarnations of the Doctor, on the programme from 1973 to 1976 (seasons 11 – 14). She and robotic dog K9 appear in the 1981 television pilot K-9 and Company. She returned in the 20th-anniversary Fifth Doctor story The Five Doctors (1983) and the 30th-anniversary story Dimensions in Time (1993), then co-starred in two BBC radio serials with the Third Doctor (The Paradise of Death and The Ghosts of N-Space), and starred in a series of spin-off audio dramas entitled Sarah Jane Smith for independent production company Big Finish. After the television revival of Doctor Who in 2005, she appears in several episodes with the Tenth Doctor, and as the central character of her own series The Sarah Jane Adventures from 2007 to 2011, which included appearances by both the Tenth and Eleventh Doctors.

In April 2020, former Doctor Who showrunner Russell T Davies released an epilogue to Sarah Jane's story on the anniversary of Sladen's death, detailing various characters attending Sarah's funeral.

Casting
Doctor Who producer Barry Letts offered the part of Sarah Jane to actress April Walker, who accepted the role and was duly contracted by the BBC. During rehearsals for The Time Warrior, it became clear to Jon Pertwee and Letts that the two leads had little rapport and were physically mis-matched (it has been claimed that Pertwee demanded the part be recast, because he said he would not play opposite an actress who was taller than him). Letts therefore released Walker from her contract (though she was still paid in full for season 11). Although committed to not talking about the issue in her release agreement, Walker began to discuss the circumstances surrounding her casting decades later. After giving some written interviews to fanzines, in May 2020 Walker gave an on screen interview to 'Time Space Visualiser' giving much further detail about the circumstances, including revealing later work alongside Pertwee. Walker admitted that although she understood Pertwee's thinking, she told him she would never forgive him for what he had done. Letts began a second batch of auditions and saw Elisabeth Sladen after a recommendation from fellow BBC producer Bill Slater, who had twice cast the actress recently in separate episodes of Z-Cars. Sladen performed her audition alongside actor Stephen Thorne and after impressing Letts, he arranged for her to meet Pertwee before any decisions were made. Pertwee stood behind Sladen and gave a 'thumbs-up' to Letts who then offered her the role.

Appearances

Television

1973–1976, 1981, 1983; introduction and classic run

Sarah Jane first appears in the Third Doctor serial The Time Warrior (1973–74), where she has managed to infiltrate a top secret research facility by posing as her aunt, Lavinia Smith, a famous virologist. Introduced as an ardent feminist, Sarah Jane sneaks aboard the TARDIS and becomes embroiled in a battle against a militaristic alien Sontaran in the Middle Ages who is kidnapping scientists from the present day. Subsequently, she accompanies The Doctor (Jon Pertwee) on several journeys in the TARDIS, and she also assists the United Nations Intelligence Taskforce led by Brigadier Lethbridge-Stewart (Nicholas Courtney) on a number of occasions. After Pertwee's departure, Sladen remains following Season 11 finale Planet of the Spiders (1974), in which The Doctor regenerates for the third time.  In season 12's consecutive 1975 serials The Sontaran Experiment, Genesis of the Daleks and Revenge of the Cybermen, Sarah and male companion Harry Sullivan (Ian Marter) face the series' three iconic recurring creatures, the Sontarans, the Daleks and the Cybermen. In Genesis Sarah is present at the creation of the Daleks and meets their creator, Davros (Michael Wisher). Sarah Jane departs in the Season 14 serial The Hand of Fear (1976) after The Doctor receives a summons to his home planet, Gallifrey. Sladen has described Sarah as "a bit of a cardboard cut-out. Each week it used to be, 'Yes Doctor, no Doctor'..."

Following her tenure as a companion, Sladen reprised the role of Sarah Jane in a pilot episode for an Earth-based spin-off series, K-9 and Company, in 1981. In the pilot episode, titled "A Girl's Best Friend", Sarah Jane receives the robot dog K9 Mark III (John Leeson) as a Christmas present from The Doctor. The pilot did not lead to a series, but the character reappeared in Doctor Who for the 1983 twentieth anniversary story The Five Doctors, in which she is transported to Gallifrey by Lord President Borusa (Philip Latham) to take part in the Game of Rassilon in The Death Zone devised by Time Lord founder Rassilon (Richard Mathews). Here, Sarah is reunited with the Third Doctor, and also meets the First, Second and Fifth. The Five Doctors shows that Sarah Jane still owns and is working with K9. The character made an appearance in the 1993 Children in Need special (a crossover with long-running British soap EastEnders), Dimensions in Time, wherein various Doctors and companions are teleported to Albert Square as part of a plot by the Rani (Kate O'Mara). Though Sladen would not make any more official Doctor Who television appearances until 2006, in the interval the actress reprised her role as Sarah Jane twice on BBC radio with Jon Pertwee, and in a series of Big Finish audio dramas, and in the unofficial direct-to-video spin-off film Downtime (1995) alongside the Brigadier, Second Doctor companion Victoria Waterfield (Deborah Watling) and Leeson in a rare on-screen role.

2006–2011, 2020; revived series and spin-off
Following Russell T Davies' 2005 Doctor Who revival, Sladen returned to the show in the Series 2 episode "School Reunion" (2006). "School Reunion" revisits Sarah Jane, still working alongside K9 since The Five Doctors, when she encounters the Tenth Doctor (David Tennant) while they both investigate mysterious goings on at a school run by Headmaster Finch (Anthony Head). Exposition in the episode reveals that, having waited years for The Doctor to return to her, Sarah Jane assumed he had died, though later came to suspect his involvement when witnessing the alien spaceship above London in Doctor Who Christmas special "The Christmas Invasion". On meeting Sarah Jane, current companion Rose (Billie Piper) reflects on her future after The Doctor. Though K9 Mark III still assists Sarah Jane, he has fallen into disrepair; after K9 Mark III sacrifices himself to save Sarah Jane and The Doctor, The Doctor leaves Sarah Jane a new K9 model, K9 Mark IV, and takes her advice by inviting Rose's boyfriend Mickey Smith (Noel Clarke) aboard the TARDIS as his second companion. The success of "School Reunion" led to the development of The Sarah Jane Adventures, starring Sladen as Sarah Jane, produced by BBC Wales for CBBC.

In The Sarah Jane Adventures, Sarah Jane investigates alien activity covertly from her manor house in Bannerman Road in Ealing, driving an emerald green Nissan Figaro and with the help of her sentient supercomputer Mr Smith (voice of comedian Alexander Armstrong), as well as an alien activity scanner and sonic lipstick device. In the special premiere episode "Invasion of the Bane" (2007), Sarah Jane adopts a son: Bane creation, genetic archetype and boy genius Luke Smith (Tommy Knight), and befriends her neighbour Maria Jackson (Yasmin Paige) during her investigation of Bane leader Mrs Wormwood (Samantha Bond). Sarah Jane remarks that since meeting them she is no longer content to live alone; she discloses she never married after parting from the Fourth Doctor, to whom no one could ever compare. Sometime between "School Reunion" and "Invasion of the Bane", K9 has left Sarah Jane to close off a black hole, occasionally passing close enough to contact her; due to the concurrent development of the K-9 television series, to which creator Bob Baker owns the rights, K9 only appears in two episodes of the first series. In the first series, Sarah Jane learns how to be a mother to Luke, the while strengthening her friendship with teenage neighbour Maria, the person Sarah Jane "trusts the most". Along with Luke and his friend Clyde Langer (Daniel Anthony) they defeat and repel various threats to the contemporary Earth. Amongst these threats, series one introduces The Trickster (Paul Marc Davis), a cosmic being who makes alterations to the timeline to cause chaos and destruction; he becomes a recurring adversary for Sarah Jane. Sarah Jane finds a new enemy in the Slitheen, a family of criminal aliens originally seen in Doctor Who, and an ally in alien research scientist Professor Rivers (Floella Benjamin). Time travel scenes also depict 13-year-old Sarah Jane (Jessica Ashworth), for whom the death of her best friend Andrea Yates (Jane Asher) gave Sarah Jane her resolve to fight against loss of life.

Sarah Jane then reappears in Doctor Who in the two-part fourth series finale episodes "The Stolen Earth" and "Journey's End" (2008), which crosses over from Torchwood and The Sarah Jane Adventures. When Daleks invade Earth, Sarah Jane is summoned along with UNIT officer Martha Jones (Freema Agyeman) and Torchwood leader Captain Jack Harkness (John Barrowman) by former PM Harriet Jones (Penelope Wilton) to help The Doctor save the universe. On the Dalek ship Davros (Julian Bleach) recognises Sarah Jane from their encounter in the classic series' episode Genesis of the Daleks. In The Sarah Jane Adventures second series (2008), Maria moves away to America in The Last Sontaran, and Sarah Jane befriends new neighbour Rani Chandra (Anjli Mohindra) in The Day of the Clown; the same episode features flashbacks to Sarah Jane's (Jessica Mogridge) childhood in her Aunt Lavinia's home. In The Temptation of Sarah Jane Smith, Sarah Jane saves the lives of her parents, Eddie (Christopher Pizzey) and Barbara (Rosanna Lavelle) in 1951; by doing so she plays into The Trickster's hands, creating a post-apocalyptic alternative universe in the present day. Learning of this however, her parents choose to die, becoming heroes to restore the timeline. In series two finale Enemy of the Bane, Sarah Jane's old friend Brigadier Lethbridge-Stewart (Nicholas Courtney) from UNIT assists her against united adversaries Mrs Wormwood and Sontaran Commander Kaagh (Anthony O'Donnell). Sarah Jane feels threatened on a personal level by Mrs Wormwood's claim to be Luke's mother as his creator. Sladen has relatively scarce screen-time in 'Sarah-lite' serial The Mark of the Berserker due to back-to-back filming. Though K9 makes no appearances in series two, he appears to assist Sarah Jane against Ambassador Ranius (Ronnie Corbett) in a mini-episode for Comic Relief (2009).

In series three (2009), Sarah Jane makes a new enemy in the body-stealing alien Androvax (Mark Goldthorp) as well as a lukewarm ally in the form of the interplanetary police force, the Judoon (from Doctor Who). In the second two-parter, Sarah Jane is able to recover K9 full-time (reflecting a real-world deal struck with the creators of the children's series K-9). In a crossover with the parent show, Sarah Jane reveals her intention to marry her secret fiancé, barrister Peter Dalton, in The Wedding of Sarah Jane Smith. However, Dalton's involvement in Sarah Jane's life proves to be a scheme of The Trickster. The Doctor gatecrashes the wedding to foil The Trickster's plot to make Sarah Jane give up on alien hunting, and explains to Sarah Jane that The Trickster is a powerful member of the extra-dimensional so-called Pantheon of Discord. The serial clarifies that Sarah Jane owes her independent wealth to her Aunt Lavina's will. In 'Sarah-lite' two-parter Mona Lisa's Revenge, Sarah Jane and Luke have their first argument as he progresses into his teenage years; they argue about the cleanliness of Luke's room. In series finale The Gift, though she is reluctant to use weapons or cause harm, when Luke falls deathly ill for the first time ever due to the machinations of the Blathereen-Slitheen, Sarah Jane takes up arms to confront them. In the episode's conclusion, regretfully she is forced to kill them using Mr Smith.

Sarah Jane next appears in the Tenth Doctor two-part Doctor Who finale, "The End of Time", in 2010. When The Doctor is slowly dying from radiation poisoning, he makes timely visits to his close friends and companions; The Doctor saves Luke's life from an oncoming car on Bannerman Road (an inside joke by Russell T Davies commenting on actors' failure to look for cars before crossing the street because traffic is always stopped for them, something that he believes is especially important in a children’s show) and bids a silent farewell to Luke and to Sarah Jane.

In the fourth season (2010) of The Sarah Jane Adventures, Sarah Jane sees Luke off to university in the first two-parter of the series, but continues her adventures alongside Rani and Clyde. The trio encounter the Eleventh Doctor (Matt Smith), as well as Sarah Jane's immediate predecessor as The Doctor's companion, Jo Grant (Katy Manning), in Death of the Doctor; aliens known as the Shansheeth fake The Doctor's death as part of a plot to gain access to the TARDIS using Jo and Sarah Jane's memories. The Empty Planet is this series' 'Sarah-lite' serial; with the rest of the population, Sarah Jane mysteriously vanishes, leaving Rani and Clyde to investigate without her. In Lost in Time, Sarah Jane is sent back in time on a mission from the mysterious Shopkeeper (Cyril Nri). Sarah Jane is convinced to retire by an alien plot in the series finale, earning a new nemesis and doppelgänger in Ruby White (Julie Graham); she is saved from Ruby when Luke drives down from university to her rescue.

Sladen's death ended the show in the middle of its fifth series, which aired in 2011. In its premiere story, Sarah Jane adopts a new child in the form of Sky Smith (Sinead Michael), a genetically-engineered alien girl with abilities relating to electromagnetism; the Shopkeeper arranged for their encounter, but declines to explain his motives to Sarah Jane. Sarah Jane's final broadcast appearance comes in series five finale The Man Who Never Was. The final story ends with a short montage of archive footage and audio recordings celebrating Sarah Jane's journey from lone investigator to mother of two surrounded by friends. The series ends with the final caption: "And the story goes on... forever."

The cast and writers of The Sarah Jane Adventures produced a special 2020 webcast epilogue for the show with a mix of narrated and acted elements entitled "Farewell, Sarah Jane". In the story, Sarah Jane's friends and many past companions of the Doctor return to London to attend her funeral.

Literature
Sarah Jane appears in several Doctor Who novels and short stories, notably in the Eighth Doctor Adventures novels Interference: Book One and Interference: Book Two by Lawrence Miles; and the Past Doctor Adventures novel Bullet Time by David A. McIntee, all taking place after she stops travelling with The Doctor. She appears in Ian Marter's Harry Sullivan's War published by Target Books; Marter played companion Harry Sullivan in seven television serials. Different accounts of Sarah Jane's life have been given in the Doctor Who literature. Interference and the Virgin New Adventures novel Christmas on a Rational Planet, also by Miles, suggest that Sarah Jane married someone named Paul Morley sometime between 1996 and 1998 and took his name. In the short story "Lily" by Jackie Marshall, in Big Finish's Short Trips: A Christmas Treasury, the Fifth Doctor pays a visit to an older Sarah Jane, who has a daughter, Lauren, and an autistic granddaughter, Lily; Lauren's father is named Will. In the Past Doctor Adventure Bullet Time, Sarah Jane is apparently killed—although the story is ambiguous about whether she actually dies—in 1997 when she sacrifices herself so that she cannot be used as a hostage to stop the Seventh Doctor from taking action to aid an escaping alien ship, contradicting her other spin-off appearances. However, the novel takes place during a story arc where enemies of The Doctor were attempting to eliminate his companions from the Timeline (revealed in the later novel Sometime Never...), and Sarah Jane's death may have been reversed when those enemies are defeated. In any case, other stories have shown her alive after 1997. Sarah Jane was mentioned in the prologue of the Virgin Publishing novelisation of The Power of the Daleks by John Peel. It revealed that Sarah Jane was working as UNIT's official chronicler and that in "1996" she covered the aftermath of the Cybermen's failed attempt to drain Earth of its energy and the technology left behind in their wake (The Tenth Planet, which was actually set in 1986).

Stories written as in-universe articles in Doctor Who Magazine Winter Special 1991 (subtitled "UNIT Exposed"), made statements about Sarah Jane's life after leaving the Fourth Doctor. She wrote a history of UNIT, Fighting for Humankind ("heavily vetted and evidently subjected to considerable censorship"), as well as a series of science fiction novels. These featured an extraterrestrial called The Doctor and his companion Nicola Jones, who frequently encountered WIN (World Investigative Network), commanded by General Lutwidge-Douglas. Titles included Day of the Dinosaurs, Sutekh the Destroyer and The North Sea Monster.

Another in-universe article was written by Kevin W. Parker, Roving Reporter, which was a biography of Sarah Jane from her childhood to the early 1990s. She grew up with her aunt Lavinia after her parents died in a car crash. She went to Caterham School For Girls and the University of Nottingham. She was engaged to Andrew Lofts, an aspiring television journalist; it didn't last. She ended up working with UNIT; her exact duties were never described. In the spring of 1981, she left UNIT after being hospitalized from an accident in a quarry.  Afterwards she developed a romantic relationship with Harry Sullivan; they parted amicably and were still very fond of each other, and were still close friends, even to the time of the article. She wrote science fiction novels World War Skaro and The Monster at the End of Space which made it onto the Times and New York Times bestseller lists.

Though there are as yet no original Sarah Jane Adventures novels, many of the television episodes have been novelised.

Audio drama
Between seasons 13 and 14, Sladen appeared as Sarah Jane, with Tom Baker as the Fourth Doctor, in the audio play The Pescatons, released on LP by The Decca Record Company Limited in 1976. She also appeared with Baker in "The Time Machine", episode three of the BBC Radio 4 series Exploration Earth broadcast on 4 October 1976. Also in 1976 she appeared as Sarah Jane alongside Tom Baker's Doctor in the first ever BBC Enterprises audio spin-off from Doctor Who: a cassette and LP release of an abridged version of Genesis of the Daleks, narrated by Baker. Sarah Jane (played by Sladen) appeared in two BBC Radio plays starring Jon Pertwee as The Doctor in the 1990s: The Paradise of Death and The Ghosts of N-Space.

She also appears, voiced by Sladen, in her own range of Big Finish audio dramas, consisting of nine stories released between 2002 and 2006. This series came to an unexpected end when the character was given her own television series, The Sarah Jane Adventures, detailed above. There are loose allusions to the audio series in the television series, including Sarah Jane's ownership of a Volkswagen.

Sarah Jane appears in two audio stories based on The Sarah Jane Adventures, released in November 2007 on CD: The Glittering Storm by Stephen Cole and The Thirteenth Stone by Justin Richards, with both stories read by series star Elisabeth Sladen. This is the first time that BBC Audiobooks have commissioned new content for exclusive release on audio. Further pairs of audio stories were released every year until 2010, again all read by Sladen. In 2011, two audio stories were read by Daniel Anthony and Anjii Mohindra.

Sladen's daughter Sadie Miller took over the role of Sarah Jane Smith for Big Finish audio dramas in 2021, first in Return of the Cybermen in March, a reworking of Gerry Davis' 1974 original script which was eventually filmed as Revenge of the Cybermen, with Tom Baker as the fourth Doctor; and then in The Third Doctor Adventures in May, with Tim Treloar as the third Doctor.

The canonicity of Sarah Jane's appearances in the audio dramas is, like all Doctor Who spin-off media, unclear, and they may not even take place in the same continuity as one another. For example, the novels' mention of Sarah Jane as having been married is contradicted by the later Sarah Jane Smith audio play Dreamland, and the Sarah Jane Adventures episode "Invasion of the Bane".

Reception, impact and legacy
Sarah Jane Smith was consistently voted the most popular Doctor Who companion until the advent of the new series in 2005. Even in more recent times the character has continued to vie in popularity with Rose Tyler, Donna Noble, and Ace. Sladen felt that part of her popularity was working alongside Pertwee and Baker, who were popular Doctors. Daniel Martin of The Guardian named her the best companion in 2007, writing that her "jolly-hockey-sticks good nature" made her so beloved. The Daily Telegraph Gavin Fuller also ranked Sarah Jane number one, praising Sladen's portrayal and saying that she displayed "great determination and bravery".

In 2012, Toby Whithouse, who wrote Sarah Jane's return to the series in "School Reunion", said she was his favourite companion from the classic series. Concerning the impact of the character, he said:

References

External links
 
 Sarah Jane Smith on the BBC's Doctor Who website ("New Series")
 Sarah Jane Smith on the BBC's Doctor Who website ("Classic Series")
 Online TV Interview on Liverpool Reporter hosted by Jonathan Thompson with Elisabeth Sladen in 2006
 BBC Norfolk Kids: The Sarah Jane Adventures
 BBC Norfolk: Interview with Elisabeth Sladen regarding Sarah Jane Smith

Doctor Who companions
British female characters in television
Television characters introduced in 1973
Fictional orphans
Fictional people from London
Fictional reporters
Recurring characters in Doctor Who
The Sarah Jane Adventures characters
UNIT
Fictional journalists and mass media people
Fictional people from the 20th-century
Fictional people from the 21st-century